Siraj Mia Memorial Model School is a private secondary school located at Merul Badda South Baridhara R/A(Rajuk Project), Badda Thana, Dhaka, Bangladesh. It was founded in 2005 by Alhaz Muhammad Monir Hossen.

History
The School was inaugurated in 2007 by Dr. Anwara Begum, wife of the then president of Bangladesh, Dr. Iajuddin Ahmed.

The school was built to commemorate the memory of the father of the founder, Siraj Mia. And hence, the name Siraj Mia Memorial Model school.

This school has now become a renounced school in the area of Badda and has a large number or students studying in it. With active support in the development of the school by the founder and the board, the school is rapidly improving and there are even rumors of an English Medium branch of this school which will most likely be constructed in Nikunja and will be about 5 times larger than this one.

References

Schools in Dhaka District
High schools in Bangladesh